Larissa Kabakova (born 1953) is a Soviet sprint canoer who competed in the early 1970s. She won two medals in the K-4 500 m event at the ICF Canoe Sprint World Championships with a gold in 1973 and a silver in 1974.

References

Living people
Soviet female canoeists
1953 births
ICF Canoe Sprint World Championships medalists in kayak